Muszaki  is a village in the administrative district of Gmina Janowo, within Nidzica County, Warmian-Masurian Voivodeship, in northern Poland. It is located in Masuria.

The village has a population of 520.

History
As of 1600, the population of the village was solely Polish. As of 1877, the village had a population of 468, Polish by ethnicity, mostly living off potato cultivation and sheep farming.

References

Villages in Nidzica County